Anna Sviatoslavovna Yanovskaya (born 23 November 1996) is a Russian ice dancer. Competing for Hungary with Ádám Lukács, she is a three-time Hungarian national champion (2018–19, 2021) and has competed in the final segment at three ISU Championships.

With her former skating partner, Sergey Mozgov, she is the 2015 World Junior champion, two-time (2013, 2014) JGP Final champion, the 2012 Youth Olympics champion, the 2014 World Junior silver medalist, and the 2015 Russian junior national champion.

Early career 
Yanovskaya began skating at age four, having become interested after watching it on television. Early in her career, she competed with Filipp Dolzhansky. She teamed up with Egor Kosheev in 2008 and skated with him until the end of the 2010–11 season. Their partnership ended when she grew too tall for him.

Partnership with Mozgov 
Yanovskaya teamed up with Sergey Mozgov in 2011. They were coached mainly by Svetlana Alexeeva at the Medvedkovo rink in Moscow.

2011–12 season: First season together 
Yanovskaya/Mozgov won the bronze medal at their first Junior Grand Prix event, in Gdańsk, Poland, and then gold in Tallinn, Estonia. Their placements qualified them for the Junior Grand Prix Final, where they placed second in the short dance, third in the free, and took the silver medal ahead of Alexandra Stepanova / Ivan Bukin. After winning the gold medal at the 2012 Winter Youth Olympics, they placed fourth at the 2012 Russian Junior Championships. At the 2012 World Junior Championships, they were third in the short dance. During the free dance the referee stopped their music because Mozgov's left bootstrap had come loose. Yanovskaya/Mozgov finished fourth overall behind American ice dancers Alexandra Aldridge / Daniel Eaton who moved up the rankings and took the bronze medal.

2012–13 season 
In 2012–13, Yanovskaya/Mozgov won a pair of silver medals at JGP events in Austria and Slovenia and qualified for the JGP Final in Sochi, Russia, where they finished fourth. They won the bronze medal at the 2013 Russian Junior Championships.

2013–14 season: First JGP Final title 
In 2013–14, Yanovskaya/Mozgov began their season by taking gold at the 2013 JGP Slovakia in Košice. They won another gold at the 2013 JGP Estonia, qualifying them for their third JGP Final in Fukuoka, Japan. Setting personal bests, Yanovskaya/Mozgov placed first in both segments at the final and won the gold medal ahead of Kaitlin Hawayek / Jean-Luc Baker. After placing second to Stepanova/Bukin at the 2014 Russian Junior Championships, they took the silver medal at the 2014 World Junior Championships in Sofia, finishing second to Hawayek/Baker.

2014–15 season: World Junior title 
Yanovskaya/Mozgov decided to remain in the junior ranks in the 2014–15 season. In addition to Moscow, they also trained in Liepāja in the summer. Mozgov recovered from a knee injury early in the season. In the 2014–15 JGP series, the duo won gold medals in Estonia and Croatia, earning qualification to their fourth JGP Final. At the event, held in December in Barcelona, they outscored Alla Loboda / Pavel Drozd for the gold and stood atop the podium for the second consecutive year. In March, they competed at the 2016 World Junior Championships in Tallinn, Estonia. Ranked first in both segments, they were awarded the gold medal ahead of Lorraine McNamara / Quinn Carpenter.

2015–16 season: Senior debut and split 
Although still age-eligible for junior events in the 2015–16 season, the duo decided to move up to the senior ranks. Yanovskaya injured her back and chin due to a fall on a lift during the summer but recovered "fully and quickly". Debuting on the Grand Prix, Yanovskaya/Mozgov placed sixth at the 2015 Skate America and 2015 Trophée Éric Bompard. In December, they finished sixth at the 2016 Russian Championships in Yekaterinburg.

Mozgov ended the partnership on 4 April 2016. In May 2016, Yanovskaya said that she was searching for a new partner.

Later partnerships 
On 16 June 2016, Irina Zhuk reported that Yanovskaya had formed a partnership with Ivan Gurianov, with the duo to be coached by Zhuk. They never competed together.

In December 2016, Yanovskaya teamed up with Ádám Lukács to compete for Hungary. Making their competitive debut, the duo placed 12th at the Bavarian Open in February 2017.

Programs

With Lukacs

With Mozgov

Competitive highlights 
GP: Grand Prix; CS Challenger Series; JGP: Junior Grand Prix

With Lukács for Hungary

With Mozgov for Russia

With Kosheev for Russia

Detailed results
Small medals for short and free programs awarded only at ISU Championships. At team events, medals awarded for team results only.

With Mozgov

References

External links 

 
 

Russian female ice dancers
World Junior Figure Skating Championships medalists
1996 births
Living people
Figure skaters from Moscow
Figure skaters at the 2012 Winter Youth Olympics
Youth Olympic gold medalists for Russia
20th-century Russian women
21st-century Russian women